Stewart Jump (born 27 January 1952) is an English former footballer in the Football League for Crystal Palace, Fulham and Stoke City. He also had a successful career playing in the United States, and was chosen as the MVP of the 1975 Soccer Bowl.

Career
Jump was born in Manchester and joined Stoke City as an apprentice in 1965. He progressed through the youth ranks at the Victoria Ground and signed a professional contract in 1970. He made his debut against Coventry City in February 1971 and played in 12 First Division matches in 1970–71 scoring once against Blackpool. Jump played 33 games in 1971–72 and made 11 appearances in 1972–73. After playing just five matches in 1973–74 he was sold to Crystal Palace for £75,000.

Jump spent four seasons at Selhurst Park making 91 appearances scoring twice and he also played three matches for Fulham F.C. in 1977. He then decided to move to the United States to play for the Tampa Bay Rowdies in the North American Soccer League for the 1975, 1976 and 1977 summer seasons. In 1978, the Houston Hurricane of the NASL purchased Jump's contract from Crystal Palace. He played two seasons for the Hurricane. He then played for several Major Indoor Soccer League teams as well as the Minnesota Kicks.

Career statistics
Source:

References

External links
 Tampa Bay: Stewart Jump
 NASL/MISL stats

Baltimore Blast (1980–1992) players
English footballers
English expatriate footballers
Houston Hurricane players
Houston Summit players
Stoke City F.C. players
Crystal Palace F.C. players
Fulham F.C. players
Major Indoor Soccer League (1978–1992) players
Minnesota Kicks players
North American Soccer League (1968–1984) indoor players
North American Soccer League (1968–1984) players
Tacoma Stars players
Tampa Bay Rowdies (1975–1993) players
Living people
1952 births
People from Crumpsall
English Football League players
New Jersey Rockets (MISL) players
Association football defenders
English expatriate sportspeople in the United States
Expatriate soccer players in the United States